Oculocutaneous albinism is a form of albinism  involving the eyes (oculo-), the skin (-cutaneous), and the hair.
Overall, an estimated 1 in 20,000 people worldwide are born with oculocutaneous albinism. OCA is caused by mutations in several genes that control the synthesis of melanin within the melanocytes.
Seven types of oculocutaneous albinism have been described, all caused by a disruption of melanin synthesis and all autosomal recessive disorders. Oculocutaneous albinism is also found in non-human animals.

Types
The following types of oculocutaneous albinism have been identified in humans.

See also 
 Piebaldism
 List of skin conditions
 List of cutaneous conditions associated with increased risk of nonmelanoma skin cancer

References

External links 

 Oculocutaneous albinism information at RareDiseases.org
 NCBI Genetic Testing Registry

Amino acid metabolism disorders
Albinism
Autosomal recessive disorders